J. K. Bhairavi is an Indian film, writer, lyricist, playback singer, composer, actor, producer and director known for his works predominantly in Telugu cinema. In 2004, he scripted Bommalata which received the National Film Award for Best Feature Film in Telugu for that year.

Filmography
As director
Jagadguru Adi Sankara

As writer.
1997 Annamayya
1998 Love Story 1999
1999 Habba (Kannada)
2001 Sri Manjunatha
2001 Vande Matharam (Kannada)
2006 Sri Ramadasu
2006 Bommalata
2008 Pandurangadu 
2011 Shakti
2017 Om Namo Venkatesaya
2019 Muniratna Kurukshetra (Kannada)

As actor
2008 Pandurangadu
2006 Sri Ramadasu

As composer
2002 Chandravamsam

As producer
1995: Kona Edaithe (Kannada)
2002: Chandravamsam

References

Telugu-language lyricists
Telugu film directors
Telugu screenwriters
Telugu film score composers
Filmfare Awards South winners
Nandi Award winners
Living people
Film directors from Andhra Pradesh
Telugu playback singers
Screenwriters from Andhra Pradesh
Musicians from Andhra Pradesh
1970 births